Ruth Stephanie Webber (born 24 March 1965) is an Australian politician. She was a Labor member of the Australian Senate from 2002 to 2008, representing the state of Western Australia.

Webber was born in Melbourne. Before becoming a Member of Parliament, Webber was actively involved in politics. She has been a member of the Labor Party since 1984 and held numerous positions within the party before 2001, where she was second on the Labor Senate ticket for the 2001 federal election, where she was elected fourth of the six seats. Her term in the Senate began on 1 July 2002. She was deputy Labor whip in the Senate from 22 October 2004 until her term ended on 30 June 2008.

In October 2006, she lost a preselection contest to then-state MP Louise Pratt and was relegated to the third position on the Labor Senate ticket for the 2007 federal election. She was then defeated by Australian Greens candidate Scott Ludlam for the sixth and final seat.

In January 2015, Webber became chief executive officer of Down Syndrome Australia, and resigned in June 2016.

References

1965 births
Living people
Australian Labor Party members of the Parliament of Australia
Labor Left politicians
Members of the Australian Senate
Members of the Australian Senate for Western Australia
Women members of the Australian Senate
21st-century Australian politicians
21st-century Australian women politicians